The Dulles Technology Corridor is a business cluster containing many defense and technology companies, located in Northern Virginia near Washington Dulles International Airport.  The area was called "The Silicon Valley of the East" by Atlantic magazine. It was dubbed the "Netplex" in a 1993 article by Fortune magazine. Another article in 2000 claimed that the area contained "vital electronic pathways that carry more than half of all traffic on the Internet. The region is home to more telecom and satellite companies than any other place on earth."

The Dulles Technology Corridor is a descriptive term for a string of communities that lie along and between Virginia State Route 267 (the Dulles Toll Road and Dulles Greenway), and Virginia State Route 7 (Leesburg Pike and Harry Byrd Highway). It especially includes the communities, from east to west, of Tysons Corner, Reston, Herndon, Sterling, and Ashburn. These communities are in Fairfax and Loudoun counties, which are the second-highest and highest income counties in the U.S. as of 2011, coinciding with the national technology and local internet boom of the 1990s and local technology spending after the September 11, 2001 attacks.

Internet infrastructure and data centers
As of 2009, more than 50% of all U.S. Internet traffic travelled through Northern Virginia. In his book Tubes, author Andrew Blum calls Ashburn, Virginia—a community within the Dulles Technology Corridor—"the bullseye of America's Internet". The Dulles Technology Corridor serves as headquarters for domain name registrar Network Solutions and network infrastructure company Verisign. The region contains the Internet Society, and used to contain the mainframe that houses the master list of all Internet domain names.

The Dulles Technology Corridor includes Ashburn, Virginia's "Data Center Alley", described by the Washington Business Journal as "an area that is quickly emerging as a national hub for data storage facilities". The corridor also has data centers in Sterling, Herndon, Reston, and Tysons Corner. The area is a growing home for major data centers including those of Amazon Web Services (AWS)'s US East region, where an estimated 70% of AWS IP addresses are housed. Wikimedia Foundation has its primary data center in the corridor. According to U.S. News & World Report, "Northern Virginia remains popular, in part because it has some of the country's cheapest electricity rates."

Business environment
The Dulles Technology Corridor has access to a highly educated workforce. Of adults aged 25 and over, 58.2% in Fairfax County and 57.6% in Loudoun County have a bachelor's degree or higher, compared with 28.2% for the U.S. as a whole.

The George Washington University's Virginia Science and Technology Campus and the Howard Hughes Medical Institute's Janelia Farm Research Campus are located in the corridor.

Company headquarters
The following companies are headquartered in the Dulles Technology Corridor:

Amazon (Amazon has two headquarters, the other being in Seattle, WA)
Alarm.com
Appian Corporation
Boeing
Blackbird Group
Booz Allen Hamilton
CACI
Capital One
Carahsoft
DXC Technology
DLT Solutions
DynCorp
ePlus
General Dynamics
GeoEye
Freddie Mac
ID.me
ITT Exelis
Leidos
Mandiant
ManTech
MicroStrategy
Mitre Corporation
Network Solutions
NeuStar
Northrop Grumman
Orbital ATK
Peraton
Raytheon
SAIC
The Sovereign Group
VeriSign
Volkswagen
X-Mode social
XO Communications

Regional offices

The following companies have major regional offices located in the Dulles Technology Corridor:

Accenture
Adobe Systems
AgustaWestland
Amazon Web Services
Amdocs
Airbus
Oath (AOL/Yahoo!)
Apple
AT&T
BAE Systems
Broadcom
Capgemini
CDW
Charter Communications
Cisco Systems
Cox Communications
Dell
Deloitte
EMC Corporation
Equinix
ESRI
ExxonMobil
Fairchild Dornier
FireEye
Google
Harris Corporation
Hewlett-Packard
Hewlett-Packard Enterprise
Juniper Networks
IBM
L-3 Communications
Lockheed Martin
Microsoft
NEC
NetApp
Nissan Motors
Nutanix
Oracle Corporation
Palo Alto Networks
Perot Systems
Red Hat
Rockwell Collins
Rolls-Royce North America
Salesforce.com
SAP
ServiceNow
Siemens
Sprint Nextel
Symantec
Tata Communications
Terremark
Time Warner Cable
Unisys
Visa Inc.
Verizon
VMware

See also
 MAE-East

References

Further reading

 

Economy of Virginia
High-technology business districts in the United States
Northern Virginia
Dulles International Airport
Edge cities in the Baltimore-Washington metropolitan area